Return of the Living Dead: Rave to the Grave (also known as Return of the Living Dead 5: Rave from the Grave) is a 2005 made-for-television action horror film directed by Ellory Elkayem and starring Aimee-Lynn Chadwick, Cory Hardrict, John Keefe, Jenny Mollen, and Peter Coyote.

The film was produced with Return of the Living Dead: Necropolis and is the fifth and final installment of the Return of the Living Dead film series.

Plot
The film opens with Charles Garrison arriving at a mortuary with a canister of Trioxin. He is greeted by a team of Interpol agents whose goal is to destroy the last of the canisters to avoid another incident. Nevertheless, one of them sprays three corpses with the gas, and revives them. Charles is killed during the incident, along with the mortuary owner and one of the government officials.

It's Halloween, and Jenny with Julian, Cody and Becky, the last three survivors of the previous film, are now in college and they receive notice of the "murder" of Charles. Julian and Jenny go to search for and possibly sell what belonged to Charles, and they find the last two barrels of Trioxin. One of them is taken to Cody, who tests the chemical inside it. Jeremy, Jenny's brother, tastes the chemical when he thinks that it is a drug similar to ecstasy, but he goes into a spasm, in which he foams at the mouth, and later describes what it was like. The chemical is named "Z" for its zombie-like effect on the living.

Cody, Jeremy and Shelby extract the chemical from the canister and they put the liquid extract into pills which they sell to Skeet, so he can sell the drug around the school. While Skeet informs everyone to only take one pill at a time for health reasons, most take more than one pill at a time which speeds up the process that causes humans to reanimate as zombies.

Gino and Aldo Serra, the only survivors from the beginning of the movie, recognize what is going on when they are shown the severed head of one of the zombies, and they go to question Julian, knowing that he is familiar with Trioxin, but he does not tell them anything of the canisters that he and Jenny discovered. Sometime later, people are turning into zombies, and the drug is being passed around a rave and getting out of control, Cody and Shelby are killed. Jenny kills Zombie Jeremy. Seeing no other option, Aldo calls in military assistance, but he is told that an American bomber plane is already on the way to the rave location. The plane launches a bomb which detonates in the center of the rave. Jenny and Julian emerge from the rubble alive and Aldo asks where’s Gino and tries to find him. It is unclear if Gino died during the blast. At the end of the film, the Tarman desperately tries to hitchhike a ride to the party, but to no avail. After scaring away a woman who almost gave him a ride, he has no choice but to walk to the party, yelling his trademark "Brains!" as he goes to the party.

Cast
 Aimee-Lynn Chadwick as Becky Carlton
 Cory Hardrict as Cody
 John Keefe as Julian Garrison
 Jenny Mollen as Jenny
 Peter Coyote as Uncle Charles
 Claudiu Bleonț as Aldo Serra
 Sorin Cocis as Gino
 Cain Mihnea Manoliu as Jeremy
 George Dumitrescu as Artie
 Maria Dinulescu as Shelby
 Catalin Paraschiv as "Skeet"
 Radu Romaniuc as Brett
 Sebastian Marina as Dartagnan
 Violeta Aldea as "Rainbow"
 Ricky Dandel as Coach Savini
 Allan Trautman as Tarman Zombie

Production
The film was shot immediately after Return of the Living Dead: Necropolis using locations and actors in Romania and Ukraine. Multiple scenes were filmed in the suburbs of Bucharest. Peter Coyote, Aimee-Lynn Chadwick, Cory Hardrict, and John Keefe returned from the previous installment.

Release and reception
An edited version of the film aired along with Return of the Living Dead: Necropolis on the Sci-Fi Channel on October 15, 2005. The R-rated version of the film was released on DVD on March 20, 2007 by Lionsgate Home Entertainment.

The film has received generally negative reception. Film critic Felix Vasquez, Jr. gave the film a negative review, though writing that "this kind of bad film gives you perfect opportunity to improvise mocking".

References

External links

Return of the Living Dead: Rave to the Grave at Rotten Tomatoes

2005 films
2005 television films
2005 horror films
2000s science fiction horror films
American science fiction horror films
American sequel films
Television sequel films
Halloween horror films
Films directed by Ellory Elkayem
Return of the Living Dead (film series)
Syfy original films
American horror television films
American drama television films
2000s American films